Kalyani railway station is a Kolkata Suburban Railway station in Kalyani, West Bengal on the Sealdah–Ranaghat line and Kalyani Simanta branch line. It is located in Nadia district in the Indian state of West Bengal. It serves Kalyani and the surrounding areas.

History
The Calcutta (Sealdah)–Kusthia line of Eastern Bengal Railway was opened to run in the year of 1862. Eastern Bengal Railway worked on the eastern side of the Hooghly River. The British Government in India established the railway station in the then Roosvelt town named Chandmari Halt in 1883. In 1954 it was renamed into Kalyani. In 1979, the rail line was extended from Kalyani main to Kalyani Simanta station and also established direct connectivity to Kolkata through  local EMU trains.

Historical Kalyani Local

There used to be a Sealdah Kalyani Local from Sealdah to Kalyani, which used to terminate at Platform no. 2 of Kalyani Main Station. Services of Kalyani Local started on 1963 after completion of electrification of Sealdah–Kalyani section. Initially, 4 pairs ran, after that, 7 pairs started in 1970. EMUs of that age were push-pulled by WAM-2 due to shortage of rakes. From 1963 to 1970, all the EMUs were 4 car rakes, namely T-S-M-T ( trailer seating motor trailer ) combinations . From 1970, they were converted into 9 car rakes . The Motor car had the DC pantograph, not like today's driving cars which have AC pantographs .

The services of Kalyani Main Local decreased after 1979 due to the opening of Kalyani Simanta local. Services totally stopped in 2014 abruptly due to poor patronage.

Kalyani Simanta Local

A branch line was laid between Kalyani and ITI More (presently Kalyani Ghoshpara in early 1940s) to facilitate transport of goods to the industries. The line used to be double line to transport steel to and from K R Steel Union pvt. ltd. The second line was dismantled in 1963. A spur to the FCI was added in 1960.

This single, industrial line was extended to present day Kalyani Simanta and electrified in the late 1977, and the old spur to FCI and some sidings were dismantled. Rather, some new electrified sidings were made, along with 3 brand new electrified spurs into the FCI. EMU services started in 1978 as trials, and commercially in 1979.

Electrification 
The Sealdah–Ranaghat route was electrified in the period of 1963–64. Subarban traffic first started as Naihati Local and Kalyani local for the first time .

References

External links

 

Sealdah railway division
Railway stations in Nadia district
Transport in Kolkata
Transport in Kalyani, West Bengal
Kolkata Suburban Railway stations